Supernanny is a reality television programme that aired on Channel 4 from 2004–08. The show features professional nanny Jo Frost, who devotes each episode to helping a family where the parents are struggling with their child-rearing. The ages of the children are the ages they were at the time the show was broadcast.

Series overview

Episodes

Season 1 (2004)

Season 2 (2005)

Season 3 (2006)

Season 4 (2007)

Season 5 (2008)

References 

Lists of reality television series episodes
Lists of British non-fiction television series episodes